Iraj Rahmanpour born in 1957 is an Iranian singer, songwriter, and writer.

Musical career 
His music career began from 1977 and numerous concerts have been held in Iran and other countries. His goal of these activities is the development of native culture. His style in singing is unique. He researches about the lost and obsolete songs and forgotten ancient languages of Iran and runs them revived with his songs. His style called “Hur” and “Moaning” in native language.which are the tradition costumes of ancient centuries in Iran. His songs are in different Iranian languages like: "Laki", "Lori" and "Persian".

Poems (songs) 
His poems in some languages (Persian, Laki, Luri), describe:
 Nature of the Zagros Mountains
 Myths and legends and beliefs of nomadic tribes of the area.
 Social problems like addiction, poverty and human disasters (earthquakes, chemical bombardment of Halabja and ...). His singing style is unique and uses a style called “Hur” and “Moaning” .
 I Write You
 Rara
 My Land
 You Are Green
 Your Secret
 Moaning
 Broken Column
 Mirror of Tears
 Spring Breeze

References

سایت میرملاس نیوز
 سایت حوزه هنری
 سایت سیمره
 سایت میراث
 سایت پارسه نیوز
 سایت لر نیوز
 سایت پارس ست
 سایت فارس نیوز 
 خبر گذاری پانا
 شبستان
 سینمای ایران
 فارس نیوز 
 
 
 
 
 
 :fa:ایرج رحمانپور

Living people
20th-century Iranian male singers
Iranian singer-songwriters
1957 births